Hackelia virginiana, a biennial plant, is commonly known as beggar's lice, sticktight or stickseed.  However, the common names beggar's lice and stick-tight are also used for very different plants, such as Desmodium species that are also known as "tick-trefoil".

Distribution
The plant is native to Eastern Canada and throughout the Midwestern and Eastern United States.

Description
Hackelia virginiana has simple, rough leaves and ribbed green stems. The plant is categorized Wetland Indicator Status: FACU (Facultative Upland).

The flowers are small and white, bourne in mid-late summer. The seeds are burs, and are very sticky. The plant is native but a well-known nuisance in deciduous forests of the eastern U.S. because the seeds can be difficult to remove from clothing and especially pet fur.  Excellent photos and descriptions of this plant are available. The seeding part of the plant—the upper stem—dies earlier than most other plants, and becomes very brittle.  Often the entire seed stem, or even the entire plant will come out of the ground if the seeds catch on clothing or fur, aiding seed dispersion.

During the plant's first year of growth it has only a basal rosette of foliage, with the flowering stalk ascending the second year. The leaves are dark green and irregularly shaped.

References

External links

University of Michigan at Dearborn: Native American Ethnobotany of Hackelia virginiana

virginiana
Biennial plants
Flora of Eastern Canada
Flora of the Northeastern United States
Flora of the Southeastern United States
Flora of the North-Central United States
Flora of the Appalachian Mountains
Flora of the Great Lakes region (North America)
Plants used in traditional Native American medicine
Flora without expected TNC conservation status